Shane Hart is an English actor and producer. He appeared in World War Z (2013), Jack Ryan: Shadow Recruit (2014) and Hummingbird (2014).
He played the role of The Guvnor in British Gangster Movie Gatwick Gangsters (2014), Jeremiah in The Singleton (2015), Elmer Spore in Witch (2015), Andrew Carter, Aryan's Lawyer, in feature film 1603 (2015), PC Pepper in Golden Years (2015), Richardson Heavy in Legend (2015), is confirmed to join the cast of Adam Jones (2015), has been announced to play the lead role of Eddie Ward in the upcoming action film The Levellers (2015) and can be seen as Albert Anastasia in Mafia´s Greatest Hits.

Early life
Shane was born to English parents in the South West UK and was raised within the care system. He has three brothers and three sisters. His mother was one of eighteen children and his father's siblings have professional history in the music and performing arts industry. At 7 years old Shane won 3rd place as Oliver Twist in a fancy dress competition during the Queen of England's Silver Jubilee celebrations before he, At the age of 11 years, performed in front of the school as an impressionist for a talent contest and later went on to take on his first role in a play, organized by the drama department at the school theatre.

Career
In 2011, Hart became actively involved with some student films and music videos, met and conversed with Jason Statham on set of Hummingbird who is said to have inspired him to further his acting skills and abilities on his craft. He later went on to appear in Charlie Brooker's Black Mirror on Channel Four Television and Feature film Jack Ryan:Shadow Recruit, starring Chris Pine, Kevin Costner and Keira Knightley. Hart continued his education and attended many workshops, courses and seminars, studying the art of acting using mainly on the teachings of Michael Chekhov. In 2014, he joined the cast of Closed Circuit (2014), starring Eric Bana as well as The Anomaly (2014), starring Noel Clarke.
The same year, he has performed in and was involved with many mainstream television Channel Productions such as The Politicians Husband and Broadchurch, both starring David Tennant, Crimewatch & C&I CHANNEL real life crime investigations, Talking to the Dead, The Royals, starring Elizabeth Hurley, 24:Live Another Day with Kiefer Sutherland, Humans, A Poet in New York and Lewis.
Also in 2014, Hart was chosen for the role of Mr. Windsor in Coolio – Time Travel Gangster (2014),Andrew Carter in 1603 (2015), alongside Danny Darren, Bent's Crispian Belfrage and Rachel Marquez, a Disciple in Londinium (2015), as Jeremiah in The Singleton (2015) as well as additional roles in A Fistful of Bullets (2016),starring War Horse`s Geoff Bell, PC Pepper in Golden Years (2015) alongside Titanic'''s Bernard Hill, Una Stubbs and Virginia McKenna, the role of Elmer Spore in feature film Witch (2015), A police officer in Honeytrap (2015), the UK Prime Minister in Star Gods of Terra (2015), The Guvnor in Gatwick Gangsters (2015) and appeared in Nollywood film International Games (2015).
In late 2014, Hart's script for his own movie The Levellers entered pre-production, which is set to also feature Brian Croucher.

In January 2015, Hart was announced to play the role of a Richardson Heavy in Legend (2015), starring Tom Hardy. In 2017, Hart has been announced to direct an eight part series Blame (2017) and upcoming motion picture Palatable. In 2018, Hart teamed up with Lionhawk Picture´s producer Pamala Hall, together with Hart´s Hartfelt Media Film Productions, to collaborate towards a movie adaption for Desuba-On Reflection.

Humanitarian Activism
In 2015, Shane Hart teamed up with friend Sarah Archer to support charities and events with personal appearances raising awareness of Cancer Research UK, Macmillan Cancer Support among others.
Hart also has a book in development designed to raise awareness of issues involving innocent children in suffering which aims to support children's charities in the UK and beyond. Known as a Humanitarian and active Advocate for World Peace he published his book Desuba-On Reflection'' on amazon.com in early 2017.

Filmography

Film

References

External links
 

Living people
21st-century English male actors
English male film actors
Year of birth missing (living people)